The list of ship launches in 1679 includes a chronological list of some ships launched in 1679.


References

1679
Ship launches